Lipinki  is a village in the administrative district of Gmina Biskupiec, within Nowe Miasto County, Warmian-Masurian Voivodeship, in northern Poland.

The village has an approximate population of 760.

During the German occupation of Poland (World War II), a forced labour subcamp of the Stalag XX-A prisoner-of-war camp was operated by the Germans in the village.

References

Lipinki